Aias Aosman (born 21 October 1994) is a Syrian professional footballer who plays as a midfielder for Pendikspor. He previously played for SC Wiedenbrück 2000, 1. FC Köln II, and SSV Jahn Regensburg. His younger brother Kaoa plays currently for SC Wiedenbrück 2000.

International career
Aosman made his professional debut for the Syria national team in a friendly 1–1 tie with Uzbekistan on 6 September 2018.

Career statistics

Club

International

Scores and results list Syria's goal tally first, score column indicates score after each Aosman goal.

Honours

Dynamo Dresden
3. Liga: 2015–16

Individual
Ionikos Player of the Year: 2021–22
Super League Greece Player of the Year: 2021–22
Super League Greece Top assist provider: 2021–22

References

External links

 
 

1993 births
Living people
People from Qamishli
Syrian footballers
Syria international footballers
German footballers
German people of Syrian descent
2. Bundesliga players
3. Liga players
Liga I players
Super League Greece players
TFF First League players
Süper Lig players
SSV Jahn Regensburg players
Dynamo Dresden players
Adana Demirspor footballers
Tuzlaspor players
FC Hermannstadt players
Ionikos F.C. players
Syrian emigrants to Germany
Syrian Kurdish people
Association football midfielders
Syrian expatriate footballers
Syrian expatriate sportspeople in Germany
Expatriate footballers in Germany
Syrian expatriate sportspeople in Turkey
Expatriate footballers in Turkey
Syrian expatriate sportspeople in Greece
Syrian expatriate sportspeople in Romania
Expatriate footballers in Romania
Expatriate footballers in Greece